Manuel III may refer to:

Manuel III of Trebizond (1364–1417)
Manuel III of Kongo (ruled 1911–1914)
Manuel III, Patriarch of Lisbon (born in 1948)